The Westin Bonaventure Hotel and Suites is a , 33-story hotel in Los Angeles, California, constructed between 1974 and 1976. It was designed by architect John C. Portman Jr.. The top floor has a revolving restaurant and bar. It was originally owned by investors that included a subsidiary of Japanese conglomerate Mitsubishi Corporation and John Portman & Associates. The building is managed by Interstate Hotels & Resorts (IHR), and is valued at 200 million USD.

Postmodern design

The hotel and its architect John Portman have been the subject of documentaries and academic analysis.

In his book Postmodern Geographies: The Reassertion of Space in Critical Social Theory (1989), Edward Soja describes the hotel as

a concentrated representation of the restructured spatiality of the late capitalist city: fragmented and fragmenting, homogeneous and homogenizing, divertingly packaged yet curiously incomprehensible, seemingly open in presenting itself to view but constantly pressing to enclose, to compartmentalize, to circumscribe, to incarcerate. Everything imaginable appears to be available in this micro-urb but real places are difficult to find, its spaces confuse an effective cognitive mapping, its pastiche of superficial reflections bewilder co-ordination and encourage submission instead. Entry by land is forbidding to those who carelessly walk but entrance is nevertheless encouraged at many different levels. Once inside, however, it becomes daunting to get out again without bureaucratic assistance. In so many ways, its architecture recapitulates and reflects the sprawling manufactured spaces of Los Angeles.

Fredric Jameson discusses the hotel in his book Postmodernism, or, the Cultural Logic of Late Capitalism.

Floors and elevators

The hotel is a 33-story building, with no floors numbered "7" or "13"; the top floor is therefore numbered "35". The four elevator banks (each containing three cars for a total of 12) are named by colors and symbols:  Red Circle (the only one that goes to "35"; the other three only go to "32"), Yellow Diamond, Green Square, and Blue Triangle. The color-coded system of directions was a later addition, as visitors found the space confusing and hard to navigate.

Location filming

Several bronze plaques commemorate elevator scenes from three major films:

 In the Line of Fire, September 1993, "Green Square" elevator
 True Lies, September 1993, "Red Circle" and "Yellow Diamond" elevators
 Forget Paris, November 1994, "Yellow Diamond" elevator

It has been featured in many movies and television series over the years including: Interstellar, Strange Days, Buck Rogers in the 25th Century (as part of the city of New Chicago), Wonder Woman, Blue Thunder, It's a Living, L.A. Law, The A-Team, Breathless, Matlock, This Is Spinal Tap, Nick of Time, Midnight Madness, Showtime, Hard to Kill, The Lincoln Lawyer, Chuck, Heaven Can Wait, Xanadu, The New Dragnet, Moby Dick, The Fantastic Journey and was destroyed (via special effects) in Escape from LA,  Epicenter and San Andreas. You can see it under construction in the 1975 film The Wilderness Family (released a year before the hotel opened). In cartoon form, the building can be seen in the first shot of Jem in the episode "The Beginning", and in the anime Steins;Gate. In November 1979, the ABC soap General Hospital videotaped some on location scenes there dealing with Luke Spencer, played by Anthony Geary who was hired to assassinate Senator Mitch Williams. In 1999, Power Rangers Lost Galaxy used the building as the administration building of the space colony Terra Venture, with Red Ranger Leo falling from the building after a battle with main villain Trakeena.

In 2002, the hotel was the location for a Fear Factor stunt which involved crossing a bridge of plexiglass discs on cables suspended on the lobby's fifth floor. The television series It's a Living was set in a restaurant atop the Bonaventure. The hotel is also showcased in episodes of CSI and its exterior can be seen in Americathon, Mission: Impossible III, Almighty Thor, Hancock, and at the beginning of the Lionel Richie "Dancing on the Ceiling" music video. The building made appearances in the 1991 Kylie Minogue music video Step Back in Time, the 1985 Survivor music video "The Search Is Over", the 2004 video game Grand Theft Auto: San Andreas, the 2012 video game Call of Duty: Black Ops II (in the "Aftermath" multiplayer map) and in the 2013 video game Grand Theft Auto V with the name "Arcadius Business Center"(having three towers instead of four towers and featuring glass elevator animations). The hotel was also used as a setting for R&B singer Usher's music video for the 2002 hit single, "U Don't Have to Call". A pivotal scene in the season four (2005) episode "Another Mister Sloane" of the espionage drama Alias took place in the Bonaventure Hotel as well, while it was also featured in season one (2017), episode 5 of another espionage drama, Counterpart. The hotel hosted the first task for the final leg of The Amazing Race 33, which aired in 2022.

References

Further reading

External links

The Westin Bonaventure Hotel & Suites, Los Angeles 

1970s architecture in the United States
1976 establishments in California
Buildings and structures in Downtown Los Angeles
Buildings and structures with revolving restaurants
Expressionist architecture
Hotel buildings completed in 1976
Hotels established in 1976
John C. Portman Jr. buildings
Postmodern architecture in California
Skyscraper hotels in Los Angeles
Bonaventure